Esthela Damián Peralta (born 8 August 1972) is a Mexican politician from the Citizens' Movement (Mexico). From 2009 to 2012, she served as Deputy of the LXI Legislature of the Mexican Congress representing the Federal District; at the time, she was part of the Party of the Democratic Revolution.

Constituent Assembly of Mexico City
Damián was the only Citizens' Movement representative elected by the voters of Mexico City to sit on the Constituent Assembly of Mexico City, which will convene on September 15, 2016.

References

1972 births
Living people
Politicians from Guerrero
Women members of the Chamber of Deputies (Mexico)
Party of the Democratic Revolution politicians
Citizens' Movement (Mexico) politicians
21st-century Mexican politicians
21st-century Mexican women politicians
Members of the Constituent Assembly of Mexico City
Members of the Chamber of Deputies (Mexico) for Mexico City